Dharmpal Singh  is an Indian politician and a member of the Seventeenth Legislative Assembly of Uttar Pradesh in India. He is currently the cabinet minister of irrigation and represents the Aonla constituency of Uttar Pradesh and is a member of the Bharatiya Janata Party political party.

Early life and education
Dharmpal Singh was born in Bareilly district. He attended the M. J. P. Rohilkhand University and attained LL.B., BEd and MA degrees.

Political career
Dharmpal Singh has been a MLA for four terms. He represented the Aonla constituency and is a member of the Bharatiya Janata Party political party.

He won his seat in the 2017 Uttar Pradesh Assembly election to Sidh raj Singh of the Samajwadi Party.

Member of the Legislative Assembly

Political position

Cow
In May 2022, he said, "sprinkling cow urine will remove obstacles in the house", the Goddess Ganga "resides in the urine of the cow" and "Sprinkling it in the house removes vastu defects or any other obstacles". He added that Goddess Lakshmi resides in cow dung.

See also
 Aonla (Assembly constituency)
 Sixteenth Legislative Assembly of Uttar Pradesh
 Uttar Pradesh Legislative Assembly

References 

Bharatiya Janata Party politicians from Uttar Pradesh
Uttar Pradesh MLAs 1997–2002
Uttar Pradesh MLAs 2002–2007
Uttar Pradesh MLAs 2012–2017
People from Bareilly district
1953 births
Living people
State cabinet ministers of Uttar Pradesh
Yogi ministry
Uttar Pradesh MLAs 2017–2022
Uttar Pradesh MLAs 2022–2027